Joanna Ayela Aleh  (born 15 May 1986) is a New Zealand sailor. She is a national champion, a former world champion, and an Olympic gold medallist.

Aleh competes in the two-woman 470 dinghy, a double-handed monohull planing dinghy with a centreboard, Bermuda rig, centre sheeting and length overall of 4.70 metres.

Early and personal life
Aleh is Jewish, and was born in Auckland, daughter of Israeli father Shuki Shukrun and British-born mother Daniella Aleh, a former Israeli soldier. She lives in Auckland where she began a degree in Mechanical Engineering at University of Auckland.  But then sailing got in the way, and she moved on to AUT to continue her engineering degree, but then found it too hard to fit sailing and university, so she is currently studying a Bachelor of Information Science at Massey University extramurally. Her Israeli name is Kesem Shukrun, and she had a Bat Mitzvah in Be'er Sheva.

In the 2013 New Year Honours, Aleh was appointed a Member of the New Zealand Order of Merit for services to sailing.

Sailing career
Just before her ninth birthday, Aleh was impressed by the New Zealand victory in the 1995 America's Cup, and asked her father if she could learn to sail. She did a learn to sail course at the Ponsonby Cruising Club and with the help of her extended family a small sailing dinghy was purchased. She began her competitive career at the age of 11 in an Optimist. Her first competition event was the Auckland Anniversary Regatta, for Kohimarama YC, in 1998.

She then made sailing history as the first female to win the Tanner Cup since its inception in 1945. This highly contested interprovincial competition is sailed in P-class sailing dinghys.

She won the Auckland Optimist Girls' Championship in 2000, in Kohimarama YC. Her first international competition was the 2002 Cork Regatta, in Kingston, Canada, in the Byte Class, where she won both the Youth and Open divisions, then moved onto the youth classes (under 18) and competed at two ISAF Youth World Championships, finishing with a Silver medal in her final year.

Aleh then began the road to Beijing, competing in the Laser Radial class (women's single handed class) with a string of successful results including a World Cup event win, and a Silver medal at the Pre-Olympic Test Event in Qingdao, China.

In 2007, she won the 420 World Championships at Takapuna, sailing with Olivia "Polly" Powrie.

She then competed at the 2008 Summer Olympics in Women's one-person dinghy, coming seventh.

Aleh and her sailing partner Olivia Polly Powrie won a silver medal in the 2010 470 World Championships in The Hague, Netherlands, and a bronze medal in the 470 World Championships in the 2011 ISAF Sailing World Championships in Perth, Australia.  She and Powrie finished fourth at the Barcelona World Championships in May 2012, won the women's 470 class in the World Cup in Weymouth, England, in June 2012, and are the current New Zealand 470 national champions.

In August 2012 she and Powrie won the gold medal in the 470 class at the Olympic Games in Weymouth and Portland, England.

In August 2013, exactly a year after winning their Olympic gold medal, Aleh and Powrie won the world title at the 2013 470 World Championships in La Rochelle, France.

Aleh's highest world rankings have been No. 1 in the Women's Laser Radial (5 March 2008), and No. 1 in the Women's 470 (2013).
She now primarily sails a 470 with the Auckland yacht club known as the Takapuna Boating Club. Her coach since 2009 has been Nathan Handley.

She is a life member of the Kohimarama Yacht Club, Takapuna Boating Club and Yachting New Zealand, and is a current member of the Royal New Zealand Yacht Squadron.

Aleh trialled with Team Brunel before the 2017–18 Volvo Ocean Race but was not selected and instead joined consultancy firm Ernst & Young.

She updates her blog: The Journey regularly where she writes about life as an athlete, the transition to 'normal' life and the journey that is life after Olympic campaigning.

See also
 List of select Jews in sailing

References

External links
 
 
 
 

1986 births
New Zealand Jews
Jewish sportspeople
Living people
Sportspeople from Auckland
Sailors at the 2008 Summer Olympics – Laser Radial
Sailors at the 2012 Summer Olympics – 470
Sailors at the 2016 Summer Olympics – 470
New Zealand female sailors (sport)
University of Auckland alumni
Olympic gold medalists for New Zealand in sailing
Olympic silver medalists for New Zealand
New Zealand people of British descent
New Zealand people of Israeli descent
Members of the New Zealand Order of Merit
Medalists at the 2012 Summer Olympics
Medalists at the 2016 Summer Olympics
ISAF World Sailor of the Year (female)
470 class world champions
Royal New Zealand Yacht Squadron sailors
420 class world champions
World champions in sailing for New Zealand
People educated at Westlake Girls High School